David Lee Webb (born November 18, 1954) is an American former politician who served in the Kansas House of Representatives and Kansas State Senate.

Webb was elected to the Kansas House in 1978, taking office in January 1979. He served three terms in the House, leaving the chamber after the 1984 legislative session. In 1991, Webb made a brief return to politics when he was appointed to fill out the remaining term of Jim Allen, who had resigned from the 11th Senate district. Webb was in the Senate from July 1991 until the expiration of the term in January 1993.

References

1954 births
Living people
Republican Party Kansas state senators
Republican Party members of the Kansas House of Representatives
20th-century American politicians
People from Johnson County, Kansas